The Rotorua Daily Post is the regional newspaper for the Central North Island including the greater Rotorua area as well as Taupo and the surrounding areas.

History
The paper was founded in 1885 as the Hot Lakes Chronicle, and received a major scoop when it covered the eruption of Mount Tarawera in June 1886. It was founded by a Mr Watt, and upon his death his wife took over. She in turn sold it to Mr David Gardner, who emigrated from Queensland, in 1905. Gardner's sons, Robin and Russell, took over upon his death in 1918. Originally published weekly, the Hot Lakes Chronicle was published twice a week by Gardner in an effort to stave off competition from a rival paper.

Originally a broadsheet, the paper was reissued in a new compact format in 2013

Other publications
The Rotorua Daily Post also publishes:

Rotorua Weekender
Rotorua Weekender is a weekly paper delivered free each Friday to all homes in the greater Rotorua area.

Whakatane News
The Whakatane News is delivered free every Thursday to all homes in the greater Eastern Bay of
Plenty region.

The Taupo & Turangi Weekender
The Taupo & Turangi Weekender is a free weekly paper delivered to each home in the greater Taupo and Turangi area.

Thermal Air
Thermal Air is a weekly tourist guide to the region's attractions. It is delivered to information sites across New Zealand as well as  all accommodation in Rotorua and its surrounds.

Hamilton News
Hamilton News is delivered weekly on a Friday to Hamilton and the surrounding area.

Te Awamutu Courier
The Te Awamutu Courier is a biweekly community newspaper published on Tuesdays and Thursdays.

References

External links
 Rotorua Daily Post Website
 Rotorua Post, Digital Edition
 Rotorua Daily Post on Facebook

Newspapers published in New Zealand
Bay of Plenty Region
Mass media in Rotorua
Publications established in 1885
New Zealand Media and Entertainment
1885 establishments in New Zealand